Megachile muansae is a species of bee in the family Megachilidae. It was described by Friese in 1911.

References

muansae
Insects described in 1911